Muslim University may refer to:

 Aligarh Muslim University
 Muslim University of Morogoro

See also
 Islamic university